In Greek mythology, Perieres was the 'overbold' king of Messene, an ancient polis in southern Peloponnese.

Biography 
Perieres' parentage and offspring vary across ancient authors. In most sources, however, he was a son of King Aeolus and Enarete, daughter of Deimachus. His siblings were Athamas, Cretheus, Deioneus, Magnes, Salmoneus, Sisyphus, Alycone, Calyce, Canace, Peisidice and Perimede.  

In some accounts, Perieres was called the son of Dioplethes, son of King Myrmidon of Phthia and possibly Peisidice, daughter of Aeolus. 

The Bibliotheca mentioned two different versions of Perieres' lineage or two distinct character named Perieres. In the first version, he could be a son of King Cynortas, the husband of Gorgophone, the famous daughter of Perseus, and the father of Tyndareus, Icarius, Aphareus and Leucippus. Meanwhile, in the second story, Perieres could be a son of Aeolus and father of only two sons by Gorgophone, Aphareus and Leucippus. In this case, Tyndareus and Icarius, along with Hippocoon and Arene, would be the children of Oebalus, son of Perieres, the son of Cynortas; their mother being the nymph Bateia. In addition, Polydora and Borus were also called his children.

According to Pausanias, Gorgophone, the daughter of Perseus, was one of the first women who married twice. She first married Perieres, king of Messene and son of Aeolus, and had by him sons Leucippus and Aphareus. After Perieres' death, she married Oebalus, king of Sparta and son of Cynortas, and had by him Tyndareus, Icarius and Arene. Pisus, son of Aphareus and founder of Pisa in Elis, in some versions of the myth, was one of Perieres' children.

The scholia on Apollonius Rhodius' Argonautica recounted that Perieres was the father of a certain Deidameia, who was the mother of Iphiclus, Althaea and Leda by King Thestius of Pleuron, the son of Ares and Demonice. According to Hesiod, Halirrhotius was also called the son of Perieres.

Notes

References 

 Apollodorus, The Library with an English Translation by Sir James George Frazer, F.B.A., F.R.S. in 2 Volumes, Cambridge, MA, Harvard University Press; London, William Heinemann Ltd. 1921. ISBN 0-674-99135-4. Online version at the Perseus Digital Library. Greek text available from the same website. 
Hesiod, Catalogue of Women from Homeric Hymns, Epic Cycle, Homerica translated by Evelyn-White, H G. Loeb Classical Library Volume 57. London: William Heinemann, 1914. Online version at theio.com
 Pausanias, Description of Greece with an English Translation by W.H.S. Jones, Litt.D., and H.A. Ormerod, M.A., in 4 Volumes. Cambridge, MA, Harvard University Press; London, William Heinemann Ltd. 1918. . Online version at the Perseus Digital Library
Pausanias, Graeciae Descriptio. 3 vols. Leipzig, Teubner. 1903.  Greek text available at the Perseus Digital Library.

External links 
 For a detailed account of different Perieres' offspring, see Theoi.com, Notes to Apollodorus 3c, 188.
Princes in Greek mythology
Kings in Greek mythology
Aeolides
Messenian characters in Greek mythology
Thessalian characters in Greek mythology
Messenian mythology
Thessalian mythology